The 1976 Navy Midshipmen football team represented the United States Naval Academy (USNA) as an independent during the 1976 NCAA Division I football season. The team was led by fourth-year head coach George Welsh.

Schedule

Personnel

Season summary

vs. Notre Dame

at Syracuse

Georgia Tech

vs. Army

References

Navy
Navy Midshipmen football seasons
Navy Midshipmen football